John Bancroft (1574–1640) was a bishop of Oxford and a University of Oxford administrator. He was Master of University College, Oxford.

John Bancroft was the nephew of Richard Bancroft (1544–1610), Archbishop of Canterbury and Chancellor of Oxford University. He was a student at Christ Church, Oxford. Bancroft was elected Master of University College unanimously in March 1610 due to his uncle's influence. The Front Quad of the college was rebuilt in stages from 1610, replacing the original medieval buildings, only to be completed much later in 1677.

In 1632, he relinquished his position of the Master of University College and became Bishop of Oxford. 
As Bishop of Oxford, he erected Cuddesdon Palace, an episcopal palace.

References

1574 births
1640 deaths
17th-century Church of England bishops
Alumni of Christ Church, Oxford
Masters of University College, Oxford
Bishops of Oxford
English male writers